Mpact may refer to:

Mpact Girls Clubs
!mpact Comics, a superhero imprint for DC Comics
MPACT!, a media processor from Chromatic Research